Kronverksky (masculine), Kronverkskaya (feminine), or Kronverkskoye (neuter) may refer to:
Kronverksky Strait, a narrow strait separating Petrogradsky and Zayachy Islands in St. Petersburg, Russia
Kronverkskoye Municipal Okrug, a municipal okrug of Petrogradsky District of the federal city of St. Petersburg, Russia
Kronverksky Avenue, an avenue in St. Petersburg, Russia, where the city services building completed by architect Marian Peretyatkovich is located